The Suicide's Wife is a 1979 made-for-TV movie and drama film directed by John Newland. The film stars Angie Dickinson, Gordon Pinsent, Zohra Lampert, Todd Lookinland, Peter Donat, Lane Davies, Don Marshall, and Majel Barrett. Kathie Browne has a supporting role. The film is based on the novel of the same name by David Madden.

Plot
An unsuccessful middle-aged college professor commits suicide, leaving his wife to cope with guilt, shame, and an angry teenage son who blames her for his father's death.

Cast
 Angie Dickinson as Diana Harrington
 Gordon Pinsent as Allan Crane
 Zohra Lampert as Sharon Logan
 Todd Lookinland as Mark Harrington
 Peter Donat as Wayne Harrington
 Lane Davies as Anson Keller
 Don Marshall as Richard Wilkes
 Majel Barrett as Clarissa Harmon
 Walt Davis as Jerry Swider
 Martin Rudy as William McGuane
 Luana Anders as Ms. Robbin
 Elaine Princi as Dorothy
 Mario Machado as Doctor
 Lorna Thayer as Therese Harrington
 Denis Berkfeldt as Bob
 Kathie Browne as Joan Davies
 Chris Ellis as Truck Driver
 Lyla Graham as Female Shopper
 Susan Niven as Secretary
 Peter Skinner as Brubaker
 Sean Spencer as Driver's Assistant
 Steven Factor as Jason Logan
 Marilyn Staley as Bank Teller
 Hillary Farrell as Teaching Assistant
 Matthew Baer as Kramer
 Alan Frost as Mr. Sloan

Production
Factor/Newland Productions produced the film.

Reception

Critical response
Tom Buckley of The New York Times wrote in his review:"Even the capable and attractive Miss Dickinson, every housewife's fantasy of herself, can't make The Suicide's Wife bearable.

Release
The Suicide's Wife was released on September 19, 1995, on VHS by Congress Entertainment.

References

Citations

Sources

External links
 
 

1979 films
1979 television films
1979 drama films
American television films